Buffalo Bill and the Indians, or Sitting Bull's History Lesson is a 1976 revisionist Western film directed by Robert Altman and based on the 1968 play Indians by Arthur Kopit. It stars Paul Newman as William F. Cody, alias Buffalo Bill, along with Geraldine Chaplin, Will Sampson, Joel Grey, Harvey Keitel, and Burt Lancaster as Bill's biographer, Ned Buntline. It was filmed in Panavision by cinematographer Paul Lohmann.

As in his earlier film M*A*S*H, Altman skewers an American historical myth of heroism, in this case the notion that noble white men fighting bloodthirsty savages won the West. However, the film was poorly received at the time of its release, as the country was celebrating its bicentennial.

Plot
The story begins in 1885 with the arrival of an important new guest star in Buffalo Bill Cody's grand illusion, Chief Sitting Bull of Little Big Horn fame. Much to Cody's annoyance, Sitting Bull proves not to be a murdering savage but a genuine embodiment of what the whites believe about their own history out west. He is quietly heroic and morally pure.

Sitting Bull also refuses to portray Custer's Last Stand as a cowardly sneak attack. Instead, he asks Cody to act out the massacre of a peaceful Sioux village by marauding bluecoats. An enraged Cody fires him but is forced to relent when star attraction Annie Oakley takes Sitting Bull's side.

Cast

 Paul Newman as Buffalo Bill
 Geraldine Chaplin as Annie Oakley
 Burt Lancaster as Ned Buntline
 Kevin McCarthy as Major Burke
 Joel Grey as Nate Salisbury
 Harvey Keitel as Ed Goodman
 John Considine as Frank E. Butler
 Frank Kaquitts as Sitting Bull
 Will Sampson as Halsey
 Pat McCormick as President Grover Cleveland
 Shelley Duvall as Mrs. Grover Cleveland
 Allan F. Nicholls as Prentiss Ingraham
 Robert DoQui as Oswald Dart
 Evelyn Lear as Nina Cavallini
 Mike Kaplan as Jules Keen
 Bert Remsen as Crutch
 Bonnie Leaders as The Mezzo-Contralto
 Noelle Rogers as Lucille DuCharme
 Denver Pyle as McLaughlin
 Ken Krossa as Johnny Baker
 Fred N. Larsen as Buck Taylor
 Jerri Duce as The Cowboy Trick Rider
 Joy Duce as The Cowboy Trick Rider
 Alex Green as The Mexican Whip and Fast Draw Act
 Gary MacKenzie as The Mexican Whip and Fast Draw Act
 Humphrey Gratz as The Old Soldier
 Dennis Corrie as Rancher
 Patrick Reynolds as President Cleveland's Aide

Altman's interpretation
Like many of Altman's films, Buffalo Bill and the Indians is an ensemble piece with an episodic structure. It follows the day-to-day performances and behind-the-scenes intrigues of Buffalo Bill Cody's famous "Wild West", a hugely popular 1880s entertainment spectacular that starred the former Indian fighter, scout, and buffalo hunter. Altman uses the setting to criticize Old West motifs, presenting the eponymous western hero as a show-biz creation who can no longer separate his invented image from reality.

Altman's Cody is a loud-mouthed buffoon, a man who claims to be one with the Wild West but lives in luxury, play-acting daily in a western circus of his own making. Cody's long hair is a wig, he can't shoot straight anymore or track an Indian, and all his staged battles with ruffians and savages are rigged in his favor. However, this does not keep him from acting as if his triumphs are real, or plaguing his patient entourage of yes-men with endless monologues about himself.

Most of the film was shot on location in Alberta, Canada, mostly on the Stoney Indian Reserve. Frank "Sitting Wind" Kaquitts, who played Sitting Bull, had been elected the first ever chief of Alberta's Nakoda (Stoney) First Nation, after three bands had amalgamated the year before.

Critical reception
A preview showing in New York in May 1976 received a mixed reaction from the press. Following this, Altman recut the film slightly by removing a few of the Wild West show acts.

Charles Champlin of the Los Angeles Times wrote that "[Altman's] films are sometimes pretentious and sometimes exasperating, but they are not often boring, although his latest, 'Buffalo Bill and the Indians, or Sitting Bull's History Lesson' is all three." He went on, "using Newman as neither villainous, heroic nor romantic but only as a fairly uninteresting lout seems a dire waste, and there is an air of low-energy distraction throughout 'Buffalo Bill.' For the last 20 minutes it is as if nobody knew how to get off that dusty reservation but would have been glad to." Arthur D. Murphy of Variety wrote that the film "emerges as a puerile satire on the legends of the Buffalo Bill era, silly when it's not cynical, distasteful throughout its 123 minutes. Paul Newman has rarely been seen so badly." Gary Arnold of The Washington Post stated, "Everyone who cares about Altman's work should find 'Buffalo Bill' an interesting and intriguing experience, but in the last analysis it's an emotionally empty, alienating movie, an ill-advised attempt to project a cynical, apprehensive view of the present onto the past." Jonathan Rosenbaum of The Monthly Film Bulletin wrote that "Altman appears to know a lot more about show business than about the American Indian, and what he knows about the former mainly consists of behavioral observation; by scaling this observation down exclusively to what illustrates his thesis—the hollow fakery of Buffalo Bill and his followers—he thus allows himself precious little to work with, thematically or otherwise. Within five minutes, everything he has to say on the subject is apparent."

Among positive reviews, Vincent Canby of The New York Times wrote, "It's a sometimes self-indulgent, confused, ambitious movie that is often very funny and always fascinating." Gene Siskel of the Chicago Tribune gave the film a full four out of four stars, writing that while the film's ideas weren't anything special, "Altman's movies are innovative. They surprise us with their physical beauty, their wit, and their style. 'Buffalo Bill's few pompous moments are overwhelmed by the fluid energy of the piece." Penelope Gilliatt of The New Yorker identified the film as being "about sorts of dreams ... perhaps it is true that white men tend to dream only of things going well, whereas Indians, like many aboriginal people, dream of death, initiation, possibility; the rock face on which waking life has no purchase."

On review aggregator Rotten Tomatoes, the film has an approval rating of 72% based on 18 reviews, with an average rating of 6.50/10.

Awards
In 1976, the film was entered into the 26th Berlin International Film Festival, where it won the Golden Bear.

References

External links
 
 
 
 
 Buffalo Bill and the Indians or Sitting Bull's History Lesson at Rotten Tomatoes

1976 films
1976 Western (genre) films
1970s American films
1970s English-language films
American films based on plays
American Western (genre) films
Cultural depictions of Buffalo Bill
Cultural depictions of Sitting Bull
Cultural depictions of Annie Oakley
Cultural depictions of Grover Cleveland
Films about Native Americans
Films about Wild West shows
Films directed by Robert Altman
Films produced by Dino De Laurentiis
Films set in 1885
Films shot in Alberta
Golden Bear winners
United Artists films